Whitewater Brewery is a craft brewery in Castlewellan, County Down. It is the largest microbrewery in Northern Ireland. The brewery produces a number of cask beers, a key lager, and three bottled beers. The brewery was founded by Bernard Sloan with his wife Kerry in 1996 on the family farm.

Beers 
Several beers are produced at Whitewater Brewery and the production changes over time.  Frequently recurring bottled beers include:

 Bee's Endeavour, 4.8% alcohol by volume (ABV)
 Belfast Ale, 4.5% ABV
 Belfast Lager, 4.5% ABV
 Belfast Black, 4.5% ABV
 Clotworthy Dobbin, 5.0% ABV
 Copperhead, 3.7% ABV
 Ewe Rebel 7.0% ABV
 Hallion 4.2% ABV
 Hen, Cock and Pigeon Rock 4.8% ABV
 Hoppel Hammer, 6.0% ABV
 Maggies Leap 4.7% ABV

Awards 
The Whitewater Brewery has won numerous awards for its beers.  Among them are:
 2011 - Great Taste Award, Single Star, for Clotworthy Dobbin bottled beer.
 2007 - International Beer Challenge, included in the World's Top 50 beers.

References

External links 
 

Companies of Northern Ireland
British companies established in 1996
Breweries in Northern Ireland
Brands of Northern Ireland
1996 establishments in Northern Ireland
Food and drink companies established in 1996